Renato Baptista Campos (born September 5, 1980) is a retired Angolan football player. He has played for the Angolan national team.

National team statistics

References

External links
 Biography at Jornal dos Desportos 

1980 births
Living people
Angolan footballers
Atlético Petróleos de Luanda players
Atlético Sport Aviação players
Association football defenders
Angola international footballers